In the Coat of Lioness' Arms aka Zdislava of Lemberk, is a 1994 Czech film. The film starred Josef Kemr. It received a Czech Lion nomination for Best Design Achievement.

References

External links
 

1994 films
1990s Czech-language films
Czech historical films